Call and Response: The Remix Album is a remix album by Maroon 5, released on December 9, 2008. It features remixes of songs from the group's first two studio albums, Songs About Jane and It Won't Be Soon Before Long, by various artists and producers.

The remix of the song "Not Falling Apart" by Tiësto peaked at number 3 on the Billboard Hot Dance Club Play chart.

Track listing

Critical reception

Giving the album a B+, Entertainment Weekly said that "The L.A. quintet makes it work on Call and Response: The Remix Album, letting those unusual suspects--along with hitmakers like Mark Ronson and Pharrell Williams--play with their master tapes."

Charts
The album debuted on the Billboard 200 at number 73.

Release history

References

2008 remix albums
A&M Octone Records remix albums
Maroon 5 remix albums
Albums produced by Bloodshy & Avant
Albums produced by DJ Premier
Albums produced by DJ Quik
Albums produced by David Banner
Albums produced by Chuck Inglish
Albums produced by Just Blaze
Albums produced by Mark Ronson
Albums produced by Pharrell Williams
Albums produced by Questlove
Albums produced by Swizz Beatz
Albums produced by Tricky Stewart